The Thomson Reuters Realized Volatility Index  is a newly developed stock market index from Thomson Reuters Indices. It measures and forecasts realized volatility at a variety of time horizons – from one day to several months.

Function  
This index can be used to construct volatility curves with a variety of time horizons. It can also be used to construct the skew necessary for pricing out-of-the-money options.  Its forecast ability allows realized volatility to be known a few days to a month in advance.  Realized volatility can be considered a more useful measure for market participants than implied volatility (IV) measures.

History 
The index was first introduced during the webcast The Long & Short of It – New Measures of Volatility on September 23, 2009, by Andrew Clark, Chief Index Strategist at Thomson Reuters Indices.

See also 
 Thomson Reuters Indices

External links
 Thomson Reuters Indices
 Thomson Reuters Realized Volatility Index 

American stock market indices
Thomson Reuters